Vandalism is an action involving deliberate destruction of or damage to public or private property. 

Vandalism may also refer to:

Property damage
Vandalism on Wikipedia, a form of malicious editing of Wikipedia
Vandalism (duo), an Australian music group
"Vandalism" (The Office), a 2013 episode
Vandalism (album), a 2011 album by Deluhi

See also